John August "Johnny" Pohl (born June 29, 1979) is an American former professional ice hockey center who played in the National Hockey League (NHL).

Playing career
Pohl played for the University of Minnesota where he helped lead the team to the 2002 NCAA National Championship. He also was a standout player at Red Wing High School in Red Wing, Minnesota, where he grew up; during his senior year there he was voted Minnesota's 1998 "Mr. Hockey." Pohl was drafted by the St. Louis Blues 255th overall in the 1998 NHL Entry Draft, and played one game with the Blues during the 2003–04 NHL season. He was traded to the Toronto Maple Leafs for future considerations on August 24, 2005. During the 2005–06 NHL season, Pohl played seven games for the Leafs and chipped in with three goals and one assist. His first goal in the NHL was scored in a 6–3 Maple Leafs victory against the New Jersey Devils on December 31, 2005. On February 17, 2007, Pohl recorded his first career two-goal effort against the Edmonton Oilers.

On July 29, 2009, Pohl signed a one-year contract returning to North America with the Chicago Wolves of the American Hockey League.

Personal
His wife is Krissy Wendell, former captain of the American national women's hockey team. Pohl had been introduced by her brother, Erik, who was Pohl's teammate and roommate at the University of Minnesota.

Following his career in professional hockey, Pohl assumed a teaching job within the business department of Cretin-Derham Hall in Minnesota, and later Hill-Murray School also in Minnesota.  In 2018, Pohl was named Athletic Director at Hill-Murray School.

Career statistics

Regular season and playoffs

International

Awards and honors

References

External links

1979 births
Living people
American men's ice hockey centers
Chicago Wolves players
Frölunda HC players
HC Lugano players
Ice hockey players from Minnesota
Minnesota Golden Gophers men's ice hockey players
People from Red Wing, Minnesota
Sportspeople from Rochester, Minnesota
St. Louis Blues draft picks
St. Louis Blues players
Toronto Maple Leafs players
Toronto Marlies players
Twin City Vulcans players
Worcester IceCats players
AHCA Division I men's ice hockey All-Americans
NCAA men's ice hockey national champions